Vithkuqi is a Unicode block containing characters for Naum Veqilharxhi's script for writing Albanian.

History
The following Unicode-related documents record the purpose and process of defining specific characters in the Vithkuqi block:

References 

Unicode blocks